Gelechia rhombelliformis is a moth of the family Gelechiidae. It was described by Otto Staudinger in 1871. It is found from the Netherlands and Germany east to Russia and from Denmark and Latvia south to Austria, Hungary and Romania.

The wingspan is 15–19 mm.

References

External links
 "Gelechia rhombelliformis (Staudinger, 1871)". ''Insecta.pro.

Moths described in 1871
Gelechia
Moths of Europe